Casco Terrace is a community in Falmouth, Maine located on Falmouth Foreside on Casco Bay.  Initially a community of summer cottages, it is now a year-round community of residents.

Casco Terrace is made up of the following:
Broad Street
Chestnut Street
Casco Terrace
Oak Street
Ennis Street
Rea Street
part of Ocean Street.

The community has an association called the Casco Terrace Association.  Casco Terrace is part of an area that DownEast Magazine has called Maine's Most Prestigious Neighborhood (Sept. 2004).  The community has access to the water and a dock and beach, as well as a "Common", "Grove" with picnic tables, and "Point" with chairs and benches facing the anchorage.

External links 
 http://www.town.falmouth.me.us/Pages/index

Neighborhoods in Maine
Villages in Cumberland County, Maine
Falmouth, Maine